Monte Cresto (French: Mont Crest) (2,548 m) is the third highest peak of the Province of Biella (Piedmont, NW Italy) after Monte Mars (2,600 m) and Monte Bo (2,556 m).

Geography 

The mountain is located on the water divide between the Lys Valley (Aosta Valley) and the Cervo Valley (Province of Biella).

Administratively is divided between the comunes of Issime (Aosta Valley, western faces) and an exclave of the Piedmontese comune of Sagliano Micca (Eastern faces).

Access to the summit 
It can be ascended following the water divide starting from Piedicavallo either from the south, passing through the Colle del Lupo (literally Wolf's pass, 2,342 m) or from the north, passing by Colle della Vecchia (Old Woman's pass, 2,185 m).

A classical climbing route which reaches the summit starts from Rifugio della Vecchia and is rated PD in the IFAS system.

Mountain huts 
 Rifugio della Vecchia (1,872 m)

SOIUSA classification 
According to the SOIUSA (International Standardized Mountain Subdivision of the Alps) the mountain can be classified in the following way:
 main part = Western Alps
 major sector = North Western Alps
 section = Pennine Alps
 subsection = Southern  Valsesia Alps
 supergroup = Alpi Biellesi
 group = Catena Tre Vescovi - Mars
 code = II/B-9.IV-A.1

Maps
 Italian official cartography (Istituto Geografico Militare - IGM); on-line version: www.pcn.minambiente.it
 Provincia di Biella cartography: Carta dei sentieri della Provincia di Biella, 1:25.00 scale, 2004; on line version:  webgis.provincia.biella.it
 Carta dei sentieri e dei rifugi, 1:50.000 scale, nr. 9 Ivrea, Biella e Bassa Valle d'Aosta, Istituto Geografico Centrale - Torino

References

Mountains of the Biellese Alps
Mountains of Piedmont
Mountains of Aosta Valley
Province of Biella
Two-thousanders of Italy